The 2011 Swedish Golf Tour, known as the Nordea Tour for sponsorship reasons, was the 26th season of the Swedish Golf Tour, a series of professional golf tournaments for women held in Sweden and Finland.

Johanna Johansson and Julia Davidsson both won two events, and Maria Ohlsson won the Order of Merit after four runner-up finishes.

Schedule
The season consisted of 14 tournaments played between May and October, where one event was held in Finland.

References

External links
Official homepage of the Swedish Golf Tour

Swedish Golf Tour (women)
Swedish Golf Tour (women)